Qiangma, also Qangma or Qiangmazhen is a small town and township-level division of Amdo County in the Nagqu Prefecture of the Tibet Autonomous Region, in China. The principal economic activity is animal husbandry, pastoral yak, goat, sheep, and so on.

Administrative divisions
The township-level division contains six village committees which are as follows:
	
Qiangma Neighborhood (强玛居委会) 
Jizha Buka Village (吉扎布卡村) 
Reka Village (热卡村)
Liangxin Village	(酿心村) 
Jiaomao Village	(觉毛村) 
Bage Village (巴格村)

See also
List of towns and villages in Tibet

References

Township-level divisions of Tibet
Populated places in Nagqu
Amdo County